Rixon Javier Corozo Hurtado (born August 8, 1981) is an Ecuadorian footballer who played for El Nacional and Independiente del Valle.

References

1981 births
Living people
Sportspeople from Esmeraldas, Ecuador
Association football goalkeepers
Ecuadorian footballers
Ecuador international footballers
C.D. El Nacional footballers
C.D. ESPOLI footballers
C.S.D. Independiente del Valle footballers